The Taiwanese Ambassador to Saint Vincent and the Grenadines is the official representative of the Republic of China to Saint Vincent and the Grenadines.

List of representatives

References 

Saint Vincent and the Grenadines
China